Villapedre is one of eight parishes (administrative divisions) in Navia, a municipality within the province and autonomous community of Asturias, in northern Spain.

Villages
 Barzana
 Cabrafigal
 El Bao
 El Barbeitín
 El Cueto
 La Peña
 Pedrosa
 Tox
 Villainclán
 Villaiz
 Villar

Parishes in Navia